Alexander Wood Munroe (14 August 1908 – 3 October 1987) was a Canadian athlete. He competed in the men's triple jump and the men's high jump at the 1928 Summer Olympics.

References

1908 births
1987 deaths
Athletes (track and field) at the 1928 Summer Olympics
Canadian male triple jumpers
Canadian male high jumpers
Olympic track and field athletes of Canada
Place of birth missing
20th-century Canadian people